Eliza Ezra Ezekiel Sassoon High School (or E.E.E. Sassoon High School), Mumbai, India. It is an English medium school recognised by the Maharashtra State Board of Secondary and Higher Secondary Education, Mumbai Division. 

It was established as a Jewish school on the year 1902 in the Magen David Synagogue compound that was built in 1864 by Sir David Sassoon as part of other philanthropic projects. It belongs to the Baghdadi Jews community and opened its doors to all communities as the Jewish population in Bombay dwindled. 

The school is located in a predominantly Muslim area of Byculla in Mumbai, alongside Sir Jacob Sassoon High School set within the same compound. Built by Sir David Sassoon, it is one of the remnants of the days of the Baghdadi Jews in Mumbai. Solomon Sopher, is the chairman and managing trustee of E.E.E. Sassoon High School Trust along with Sir Jacob Sassoon and Allied Trusts.

It was awarded recognition by the Maharashtra State Board of Secondary and Higher Secondary Education, giving it SSC Board examination status in 1984. The demographic structure of student body is 98% Muslim.  The school is run by a Jewish trust, has been mostly headed by a Catholic Christian, the principal is a Hindu and teaching staff are mostly Hindus, while the majority of students are Muslims.

See also 
 List of schools in Mumbai

References 

Private schools in Mumbai
High schools and secondary schools in Mumbai
Schools in Colonial India